Richard Delbrück (14 July 1875, Jena – 22 August 1957, Bonn) was a German classical archaeologist who specialized in the field of ancient Roman portraiture.

Career 
In 1899 he graduated from the University of Bonn, where he was a student of Georg Loeschcke. From 1911 to 1915, he was head of the Deutsches Archäologisches Institut (DAI) in Rome. He was later a professor of classical archaeology at the Universities of Giessen (1922–1928) and Bonn (1928–1940).

Selected works 
 Hellenistische bauten in Latium – Hellenistic buildings in Latium.
 Antike Porträts, 1912 – Classical portraiture.
 Bildnisse römischer kaiser, 1914 – Portraits of Roman emperors.
 Die Consulardiptychen und verwandte Denkmäler, 1926 – The consular diptych and related monuments.
 Antike porphyrwerke, 1932 – Ancient porphyry works.
 Spätantike Kaiserporträts von Constantinus Magnus bis zum Ende des Westreichs, 1933 – Late ancient Roman Imperial portraits: From Constantine Magnus until the end of the Western Roman Empire.
 Probleme der Lipsanothek in Brescia, 1952  – treatise on the Lipsanotheca of Brescia.

References 

1875 births
1957 deaths
Writers from Jena
People from Saxe-Weimar-Eisenach
Archaeologists from Thuringia
Academic staff of the University of Bonn
Academic staff of the University of Giessen